Eremophila eversa is a flowering plant in the figwort family, Scrophulariaceae and is endemic to a restricted area of Western Australia. It is known from only one plant, now thought to have died. It is a small shrub with small leaves and hairy purple to lilac-coloured flowers.

Description
The leaves are arranged alternately along the stem and are crowded so that they overlap slightly. The lower part of the leaf is pressed against the stem while the upper half is curved outwards.

The petal tube is purple on the outside, lilac inside with dark purple spots. The outside of the tube and the petal lobes are hairy, the inside of the lobes glabrous and the inside of the tube is full of long, soft hairs. The 4 stamens are fully enclosed in the petal tube. Flowering occurs in September but the characteristics of the fruits are not known.

Taxonomy and naming
The species was first formally described by Robert Chinnock in 2007 and the description was published in Eremophila and Allied Genera: A Monograph of the Plant Family Myoporaceae. The type specimen was collected by William Fletcher on Yerilla Station. The specific epithet (evera) is a Latin word meaning "turned abruptly outwards", referring to the leaves which turn outwards.

Distribution and habitat
Eremophila eversa is only known from the type specimen, collected at Yerilla Station in the Murchison biogeographic region. That plant was fenced to protect it from grazing animals but appears to have died. Searches in 2004 failed to find any living examples of the species.

Conservation status
Eremophila eversa is classified as "Priority One" by the Government of Western Australia Department of Parks and Wildlife, meaning that it is known from only one or a few locations which are potentially at risk.

References

eversa
Eudicots of Western Australia
Plants described in 2007
Endemic flora of Western Australia
Taxa named by Robert Chinnock